Rafeeq Mangalassery is a Malayalam-language script writer and director from Chettippadi (Malappuram Kerala) in India. His drama Annaperuna depicts wastage of food while many others go hungry. He also directed Kottem Kareem.

He won the Kerala Sahitya Akademi Award for Drama for Jinnu Krishnan in 2013 and Kerala Sangeetha Nataka Akademi award for best script for Iratta Jeevithangaliloode (Through the Twin Lives).

References 

Indian dramatists and playwrights
Indian theatre directors
Year of birth missing (living people)
Living people